Attitash Mountain Resort is a ski area located on U.S. Route 302 in Bartlett, New Hampshire, near North Conway. Constructed in 1938 by the Works Progress Administration, as of October 2019, Attitash is operated by Vail Resorts (after being purchased from the previous owners, Peak Resorts). It operates under a special-use permit with the White Mountain National Forest.

Located in the heart of the White Mountains, Attitash is home to two mountains, Attitash and Bear Peak. Attitash/Bear Peak has a total of 68 ski runs. It is a resort that appeals to all skill levels.

It was announced that starting in the 2023-2024 ski season, both peaks will have a high speed quad going from the base to summit (Presently only Bear Peak does). Attitash means "blueberry" in the Abenaki language.

Mountain statistics
Vertical drop:  (Attitash);  (Bear Peak)
Base elevation:  (Attitash);  (Bear Peak)
Summit elevation:  (Attitash);  (Bear Peak)
Trails and glades: 68; most difficult 27%; more difficult 44%; easiest 29%
Total skiable area: 
Trail length: 
Tree skiing:  of terrain in different glades across Attitash and Bear Peak
Average annual snowfall: 
Typical season length: Early December through Early April (depending on natural snowfall and how often temperatures are low enough to allow snowmaking)
Hours of operation: 8:30 a.m. to 4:00 p.m. weekends and holidays, EST; 9:00 a.m. to 4:00 p.m. mid-week, EST; Times may vary early season: Nov to Dec - 3:30 PM
Uphill lift capacity: 14,385 people per hour

Lifts

Attitash has 7 lifts, and 1 magic carpet. While new lifts have been installed, they are usually to replace a current lift. The exceptions were the Top Notch Double, which extended the peak to 3/4 of the way up Little Attitash Mountain instead of halfway, requiring a new lift line, and the Summit Triple. As the name suggests, The Summit Triple went all the way up. After the original lift was replaced by a high speed quad to serve the lower half of the mountain, Peak Resorts stopped running The Top Notch Double in 2014 and removed that as well in 2018.

Winter

Attitash has two peaks, Attitash and Bear Peak, both of which offer a variety of terrain. Attitash consists of old New England-style trails, many of which are narrow with challenging fall lines. It also offers a learning center, featuring a Snowbelt, Learning Center chairlift and the Progression Quad (formerly the Double Double chairlift), which provides access to beginner green trails and an intermediate blue trail.

Several black diamond trails, namely Upper Ptarmigan, Middle Ptarmigan, and Tim's Trauma, have a very high difficulty even in good conditions due to the terrain. Attitash also features several beginner-friendly green trails, such as Counselor's Run and Inside Out, and moderate blue trails, such as Ammonoosuc and Upper/Lower Cathedral. There is one official glade located between Lower Cathedral and Lower Highway.

Bear Peak was developed by the American Ski Company as a competitor, but financial issues prevented it from opening until a partnership deal was reached with Attitash, who needed their connections to get permits. It features wider trails and more glades, most of which are located directly under the Abenaki lift, with the other being located on Wandering Skis. Highlights on this peak include that trail due to its long length with a steady drop, the racing trail Illusion with its balance of flats and steeps, as well as a few other black diamonds that range in difficulty. Although there is a small kids' area, it is much smaller compared to the Attitash kids' area.

Both mountains have high-speed quads, with the Flying Bear at Bear Peak taking skiers straight to the summit 1,462 vertical feet in 8 minutes (6 with no stops), and the Flying Yankee at Attitash taking skiers halfway up the mountain 860 vertical feet in 6 minutes (4.5 minutes no stops). The Summit Triple (1,659 vertical feet) takes about 16 minutes to get to the top with pauses or 11.5 minutes with no pauses. 

In the era of Peak Resorts, snowmaking and grooming were vastly improved, and Attitash Mountain Resort finally overcame its long Chapter 11 Bankruptcy. While the half pipe was removed, the terrain park was arguably improved by splitting it into three separate parks and moving them all to Bear Peak, allowing the blue they originally occupied to be used for the ski school.

In the second half of the 2018/2019 season, the top half of Attitash was closed due to major problems with the Summit Triple lift. Despite a fairly new bull wheel (replaced just a few years earlier to prevent further breakdowns), it was found to also be in need of massive repair to the gear box, including a replacement planetary gear. 

In the 2021-2022 ski season, technical issues plagued the Double Double and Kachina Triple lifts. Vail announced the replacement of the Double Double with a fixed-quip quad (not high speed), and repairs to the Kachina Triple, both to be completed by the start of the 2022-23 ski season.

Approval for a replacement of the Summit Triple lift was given in November 2022, with the replacement scheduled to be opened in time for the 2023-2024 ski season. The new summit lift, dubbed The Mountaineer, will cut the time to the summit to six minutes.

Summer
Attitash also has summer activities. A summer day pass includes the alpine slides, both of which run the same route starting halfway up the mountain, the mountain coaster (similar to the alpine slide, but allows for higher speeds due to being locked onto the track), a climbing wall, Euro bungee trampolines, a giant air bag jump, and cornhole boards.

Three attractions available for an additional cost are Mountain biking, horseback riding and the newest attraction, the East Coast's longest single-span zip-line, installed by previous owner Peak Resorts. Closed in 2020, 2021, and 2022 due to COVID, Attitash resumed summer operations in 2023.

The mountain formerly featured four water slides that were demolished in Fall 2022 to make way for lift improvements. However, General Manager Brandon Swartz has announced that new summer attractions are being discussed for 2023. All other summer attractions are expected to return, though it is unclear whether annual events like the Blueberry Festival will also resume.

External links
 Attitash - Official site

References

Buildings and structures in Carroll County, New Hampshire
Ski areas and resorts in New Hampshire
Peak Resorts
Tourist attractions in Carroll County, New Hampshire
Works Progress Administration in New Hampshire
Bartlett, New Hampshire